Below is an incomplete list of those who have served as Lord Chamberlains to British royal consorts.

With the exception of Diana, Princess of Wales, the office has been created for the Princess of Wales and continued if and when they become queen consort. Also, the office is not created for male consorts.

Lord Chamberlains to Queen Henrietta Maria (1625–1669)
1628–?: Edward Sackville, 4th Earl of Dorset

Lord Chamberlains to Queen Catherine (1662–1705)
1662–1665: Philip Stanhope, 2nd Earl of Chesterfield
1665–1674?: Henry Hyde, Viscount Cornbury
1675–1676: Francisco de Melo
1676–1680: Thomas Butler, 6th Earl of Ossory
1680–1705: Louis de Duras, 2nd Earl of Feversham

Lord Chamberlains to Queen Mary (1685–1688)
1685–1688: Sidney Godolphin, 1st Baron Godolphin

Lord Chamberlains to Caroline, Princess of Wales, later Queen Caroline (1714–1737)
1714–1717: Scroop Egerton, 4th Earl of Bridgewater
1717–1737: Henry de Nassau d'Auverquerque, 1st Earl of Grantham

Lord Chamberlains to Augusta, Princess of Wales (1748–1772)
1736–1772: Sir William Irby, 2nd Baronet (Vice-Chamberlain 1736–1748, Baron Boston from 1761)

Lord Chamberlains to Queen Charlotte (1761–1818)
1761–1762: Robert Montagu, 3rd Duke of Manchester
1762–1763: Hugh Percy, 2nd Earl of Northumberland
1763–1768: Simon Harcourt, 1st Earl Harcourt
1768–1777: John West, 2nd Earl De La Warr
1777–1780: Francis Osborne, Marquess of Carmarthen
1780–1792: Thomas Brudenell-Bruce, 1st Earl of Ailesbury
1792–1818: George Douglas, 16th Earl of Morton

Lord Chamberlains to Queen Adelaide (1830–1837)
1830–1831: Richard Curzon-Howe, 1st Earl Howe
1831–1833: Vacant
1833–1834: William Feilding, 7th Earl of Denbigh
1834–1837: Richard Curzon-Howe, 1st Earl Howe

Lord Chamberlains to Alexandra, Princess of Wales, later Queen Alexandra (1873–1925)
1873–1903: Charles Colville, 1st Baron Colville of Culross (Viscount Colville of Culross from 1902)
1903–1925: Richard Curzon, 4th Earl Howe

Lord Chamberlains to Mary, Princess of Wales, later Queen Mary (1901–1953)
1901–1922: Anthony Ashley-Cooper, 9th Earl of Shaftesbury
1922–1947: Charles Paget, 6th Marquess of Anglesey
1947–1953: Vacant?

Lord Chamberlains to Queen Elizabeth, later Queen Elizabeth, The Queen Mother (1937–2002)
1937–1965: David Ogilvy, 12th Earl of Airlie
1965–1992: Simon Ramsay, 16th Earl of Dalhousie
1992–2002: Robert Lindsay, 29th Earl of Crawford

See also
Lord Chamberlain
List of Lord Chamberlains

References

Positions within the British Royal Household
Lists of office-holders in the United Kingdom